"Kuule minua" is a Finnish-language song by Finnish pop rock band Haloo Helsinki!. It was released on 15 July 2011 by EMI Finland as the third single from their third studio album III.

Track listing

Charts

References

External links
 Official music video of "Kuule minua" on Youtube

2011 singles
Haloo Helsinki! songs
Finnish-language songs